Balukhali refugee camp is a Rohingya refugee camp in Cox's Bazar, Bangladesh. The International Organization for Migration refers to the collective settlement of Balukhali and neighbouring Kutupalong refugee camp as the Kutupalong–Balukhali expansion site.

In March 2021, a massive fire destroyed much of the camp, killing over a dozen people and further displacing thousands.

Gallery

References

Populated places in Cox's Bazar District
Refugee camps in Bangladesh
Rohingya diaspora